Freeway 1  is the first and longest freeway in Iraq. It extends from Umm Qasr Port in Basra to Ar Rutba in Anbar, where it spreads into a new freeway with same number towards Syria and Jordan.

The part of the freeway from Nasiriyah to Al Diwaniyah is a single carriageway, because the second carriageway is not completed.

Major cities along the route
Basrah
Nasiriyah
Al Diwaniyah
Al Hillah
Baghdad
Fallujah
Habbaniyah
Ramadi
Ar Rutba

Roads in Iraq